The ASUN Conference softball tournament (sometimes known simply as the ASUN Tournament) is the conference championship tournament in college softball for the ASUN Conference. It is a single-elimination (since 2006) tournament and seeding is based on regular season records. The winner receives the conference's automatic bid to the NCAA Division I softball tournament.

Format
The top eight teams from the regular season compete in the double-elimination tournament.

Champions

Year-by-year

By school
{| class="wikitable"
|-
! School
! Championships
! Years
|-
| Florida Atlantic || 9 || 1997, 1998, 1999, 2000, 2001, 2002, 2003, 2004, 2006
|-
| Stetson || 5 || 1986, 1987, 1988, 2007, 2014
|-
| Georgia State || 5 || 1989, 1990, 1992, 1993, 1994
|-
| USC Upstate || 4 || 2013, 2015, 2016, 2017
|-
| Campbell || 3 || 1995, 2008, 2009
|-
| Liberty || 2 || 2021, 2022
|-
| Lipscomb || 2 || 2010, 2019
|-
| Florida Gulf Coast || 1 || 2012
|-
| Jacksonville || 1 || 2011
|-
| Jacksonville State || 1 || 1996
|-
| Kennesaw State || 1 || 2018
|-
| Samford || 1 || 1991
|-
| UCF || 1 || 2005
|}Italics indicates the school does currently not sponsor softball in the ASUN.''

References